Lusakert may refer to:
Argel, Armenia
Arevshat, Armenia
Lusakert, Shirak, Armenia
Lusakert, Ararat, Armenia